This is a list of singles which have reached number one on the Irish Singles Chart in 1974.

See also 
 1974 in music
 Irish Singles Chart
 List of artists who reached number one in Ireland

1974 in Irish music
1974 record charts
1974